The decisional composite residuosity assumption (DCRA) is a mathematical assumption used in cryptography. In particular, the assumption is used in the proof of the Paillier cryptosystem.

Informally, the DCRA states that given a composite  and an integer , it is hard to decide whether  is an -residue modulo . I.e. whether there exists a  such that

See also 
 Quadratic residuosity problem
 Higher residuosity problem

References 
 P. Paillier, Public-Key Cryptosystems Based on Composite Degree Residuosity Classes, Eurocrypt 1999.

Computational hardness assumptions